This article presents a list of the historical events and publications of Australian literature during 1902.

Books 
 Louis Becke – Breachley, Black Sheep
 Rolf Boldrewood – The Ghost Camp, or, The Avengers
 Guy Boothby
 The Childerbridge Mystery
 The Curse of the Snake
 The Kidnapped President
 Louise Mack – An Australian Girl in London
 Rosa Praed – The Insane Root: A Romance of a Strange Country
 Ethel Turner – The Raft in the Bush
 Lilian Turner – Young Love

Short stories 
 Barbara Baynton – Bush Studies
 Louis Becke
 The Jalasco Brig 
 The Strange Adventure of James Shervinton and Other Stories
 Guy Boothby – Uncle Joe's Legacy and Other Stories
 Henry Lawson
 "A Child in the Dark, and a Foreign Father"
 Children of the Bush
 "Send Round the Hat"
 A. B. Paterson 
 "Sitting in Judgement : A Show Ring Sketch"
 "Thirsty Island"
 Rosa Praed – Dwellers by the River

Poetry 

 E. J. Brady – The Earthen Floor
 James William Harbinson – Poems
 Breaker Morant and Frank Renar – Bushman and Buccaneer: Harry Morant: His 'Ventures and Verses
 Breaker Morant – "Butchered to Make a Dutchman's Holiday"
 A. B. Paterson – Rio Grande's Last Race and Other Verses
 Victor J. Daley – "The Woman at the Washtub"
 J. Brunton Stephens – The Poetical Works of Brunton Stephens

Drama 
 Charles Haddon Chambers 
 The Awakening: A Play in Four Acts
 A Modern Magdalen
 The Open Gate: An Original Domestic Drama in One Act

Biography 
 J. H. M. Abbott – Tommy Cornstalk : Being Some Account of the Less Notable Features of the South African War from the Point of View of the Australian Ranks (1902)

Births 
A list, ordered by date of birth (and, if the date is either unspecified or repeated, ordered alphabetically by surname) of births in 1902 of Australian literary figures, authors of written works or literature-related individuals follows, including year of death.

 22 February – Robert D. Fitzgerald, poet (died 1987)
 2 May – Alan Marshall, novelist (died 1984)
 17 July – Christina Stead, novelist (died 1983)
 19 July – Ada Verdun Howell, poet and writer (died 1981)
 20 July – Gilbert Mant, journalist and writer (died 1997)
 21 September – Dymphna Cusack, novelist (died 1981)

Deaths 
A list, ordered by date of death (and, if the date is either unspecified or repeated, ordered alphabetically by surname) of deaths in 1902 of Australian literary figures, authors of written works or literature-related individuals follows, including year of birth.

 15 February – Arthur Patchett Martin, writer and editor (born 1851)
 27 February – Breaker Morant, poet (born 1864)
 29 June – James Brunton Stephens, poet and editor (born 1835)

See also 
 1902 in poetry
 List of years in literature
 List of years in Australian literature
 1902 in literature
 1901 in Australian literature
 1902 in Australia
 1903 in Australian literature

References

 
Australian literature by year
20th-century Australian literature